The Macchi M.C.77 was a reconnaissance bomber flying boat built by Macchi in the thirties and remained at the prototype stage.

Development and design
In 1933 the Ministry of Aeronautics issued a specification for the supply of a new reconnaissance and bombing seaplane to be allocated to the Departments of the Regia Aeronautica with the intent of replacing the Savoia-Marchetti S.78 in service since 1932. The CRDA CANT, aeronautical division of the Cantieri Riuniti of the Adriatic and later also the Aeronautica Macchi participated in the competition announcement. 

The Macchi M.C.77 was characterized by the central hull configuration with a single step and side floats, high-cantilever monoplane with cantilever, equipped with a motor in a pushing configuration positioned above the hull on a tubular castle. The structure was of mixed type with metal fuselage having the war load stowed inside on one side and the other. 

The project was presented to the Regia Aeronautica in 1934, to build the prototype already started, when the rival CANT Z.501 had already flown. The Air Force Genie, however, deemed the project interesting, but significant delays accumulated so that the prototype was only completed in 1935 and was not yet ready for the acceptance tests that were to take place in Nisida in August 1936. At this point, the Regia Aeronautica chose the Z.501 as the replacement for the S.78. 

The Macchi also built a scale model that presented to the public at the 1st Milan International Air Show in October 1935, but not getting feedback in the military aviation market decided to stop its development.

Specifications

See also

References

1930s Italian patrol aircraft
Flying boats
MC.077
Single-engined tractor aircraft
Parasol-wing aircraft